Papuodendron lepidotum (Common name Saping Ningi) is a rainforest tree endemic to New Guinea, and belongs to the family Malvaceae. It is relatively slender at two foot (61 cm ) D.B.H. (diameter at breast height) Leaves are ovate or lanceo-ovate.

References 

Hibisceae